This is the discography of American rapper GZA.

Albums

Singles

Guest appearances

References

External links

 GZA on Facebook
 GZA on Twitter
 GZA on Genius
 

Discographies of American artists